The Combat Arms Regimental System (CARS), was the method of assigning unit designations to units of some of the combat arms branches of the
United States Army, including Infantry, Special Forces, Field Artillery, and Armor, from 1957 to 1981. Air Defense Artillery was added in 1968.

CARS was superseded by the U.S. Army Regimental System (USARS) in 1981, although the term "Regiment" was never appended to the official name or designation of CARS regiments, and was not added to USARS regiments until 2005.

History
Before the adoption of CARS, there was no satisfactory means of maintaining the active life of the combat arms organizations. Whenever the nation entered periods of military retrenchment, units were invariably broken up, reorganized, consolidated, or disbanded. During periods of mobilization, large numbers of new units were created. Changes in weapons and techniques of warfare produced new types of units to replace the old ones. As a result, soldiers frequently served in organizations with little or no history, while units with long combat records remained inactive.

In the late 1950s requirements for maneuverable and flexible major tactical organizations demanded highly mobile divisions with greatly increased firepower. For this purpose the regiment was deemed too large and unwieldy and had to be broken up into smaller organizations. (Most artillery and armored regiments had already been broken up for flexibility and maneuverability during World War II.)

When the U.S. Army division was reorganized under the Pentomic structure in 1957, the traditional regimental organization was eliminated, raising questions as to what the new units were to be called, how they were to be numbered, and what their relationship to former organizations was to be.

On 24 January 1957 the Secretary of the Army approved the CARS concept, as devised by the Deputy Chief of Staff for Personnel, which was designed to provide a flexible regimental structure that would permit perpetuation of unit history and tradition in the new tactical organization of divisions, without restricting the organizational trends of the future.

Units that participated in CARS
 There were 61 Regular Army infantry regiments and 18 Army Reserve infantry regiments, plus the 1st Special Forces, in the Combat Arms Regimental System. 
 There were 30 Regular Army armor/cavalry regiments in the Combat Arms Regimental System. The only Regular Army combat units not organized under CARS were the 2nd, 3rd, 6th, 11th, and 14th Armored Cavalry Regiments. 
 There were 82 Regular Army artillery regiments in the Combat Arms Regimental System – 58 field artillery regiments and 24 air defense artillery regiments.
 Except for the 18 Army Reserve infantry regiments, those regiments organized under CARS had elements in both the Regular Army and the Army Reserve. In the Army National Guard, each state has its own regiments. The number of CARS regiments varied as troop allotments change. The 1st Special Forces has elements in all three components – Regular Army, Army Reserve and Army National Guard.

The criteria for the majority of the regiments selected were two factors: age (one point for each year since original organization) and honors (two points for each campaign and American decoration). Those regiments with the most points were selected for inclusion in the system.

CARS implementation phases

 Phase I: Reorganization of Regular Army regiments (1957)
 Phase II: Reorganization of Army Reserve regiments (1959)
 Phase III: Reorganization of Army National Guard regiments (1959)
 Phase IV: Mobilization planning (1957–present)
 Phase V: Organization of regimental headquarters (subsequently suspended indefinitely)

Organization

Each company, battery or troop in the regiment (as originally organized) was reorganized as the headquarters and headquarters element of a new battle group, battalion, or squadron in the new regiment. The new battle group, battalion, or squadron's organic elements (lettered elements, such as "Company A") were constituted and activated as new units. Each of the old companies, batteries, or troops of the former regiment also had the capability of becoming a separate company, battery, or troop in the new regiment. The regimental headquarters was transferred to Department of the Army control. (For detailed charts of typical regiments reorganized under CARS, see below Illustrations of organization under CARS)

The lowest numbered or lettered active element of the regiment normally has custody of the regimental properties. If, however, the lowest numbered or lettered active element is unable to care for the properties, they may be transferred to the next lowest numbered or lettered active element. If a numbered or lettered element of the regiment is activated lower than the one having custody of the regimental properties, the properties will not necessarily be transferred.

Difference between a brigade and a regiment

In a regiment not organized under CARS, there is a fixed number of organic elements organized into battalions or squadrons. For example, the infantry regiment of World War II contained twelve companies A through M (minus J – not used) divided into three battalions (of four companies each), plus supporting elements such as the service company.

A brigade, on the other hand, is a flexible organization; it has no permanent elements. A brigade may have several different kinds of units assigned to it, such as: three light infantry battalions or two mechanized infantry and an armor battalion or one light, one mechanized and one armor battalion; plus support units. The usual number of maneuver battalions was three; however, this was a guideline not a rule (ex: the 173rd Airborne Brigade in Vietnam had four airborne infantry battalions).

In tactical structure, therefore, it is very similar to the Regimental Combat Team of World War II and Korean War. Its maneuver (infantry and armor) elements were not required to be from the same regiment. Since they were flexible, except for the headquarters and headquarters company, no two brigades need be alike, whereas all regiments were fixed with organic elements provided for under basic tables of organization and equipment.

Battle honors
Each battalion or squadron of a CARS regiment has a replica of the regimental colors with the number of the battalion or squadron in the upper fly. The streamers attached to the colors were those for the regiment, as determined when the regiment was reorganized under CARS, plus those subsequently earned by the battalion or squadron.

Those campaigns and decorations actually earned by the battalion or squadron were shown on the streamers by earned honor devices. Regimental honors were listed on the battalion or squadron Lineage and Honors Certificates, with the earned honors being marked by asterisks.

Separate batteries, troops, and companies of CARS regiments display only those honors they actually earned, not the regimental ones. Campaign participation credit for these guidon-bearing units are displayed by silver bands and decorations streamers. (See ARs 672-5-1, 840-10 and 870-5 for further details.) Personnel wear the distinctive insignia for their regiment and the shoulder sleeve insignia of their division or other tactical organization to which they were assigned. (See AR 670-5 for further details.) The Adjutant General controls the designations of elements to be activated and coordinates his selections with the Center of Military History.

Regiments organized under Combat Arms Regimental System

Armor

 13th Armor
 32nd Armor
 33rd Armor
 34th Armor
 35th Armor
 37th Armor
 40th Armor
 63rd Armor
 64th Armor
 66th Armor
 67th Armor
 68th Armor
 69th Armor
 70th Armor
 72nd Armor
 73rd Armor
 77th Armor
 81st Armor

Air Defense Artillery

 1st Air Defense Artillery
 2nd Air Defense Artillery
 3rd Air Defense Artillery
 4th Air Defense Artillery
 5th Air Defense Artillery
 6th Air Defense Artillery
 7th Air Defense Artillery
 38th Air Defense Artillery
 43rd Air Defense Artillery
 44th Air Defense Artillery
 51st Air Defense Artillery
 52nd Air Defense Artillery
 55th Air Defense Artillery
 56th Air Defense Artillery
 57th Air Defense Artillery
 59th Air Defense Artillery
 60th Air Defense Artillery
 61st Air Defense Artillery
 62nd Air Defense Artillery
 65th Air Defense Artillery
 67th Air Defense Artillery
 68th Air Defense Artillery
 71st Air Defense Artillery
 517th Air Defense Artillery
 562nd Air Defense Artillery

Cavalry

 1st Cavalry
 4th Cavalry
 5th Cavalry
 6th Cavalry
 7th Cavalry
 8th Cavalry
 9th Cavalry
 10th Cavalry
 12th Cavalry

Field Artillery

 1st Field Artillery
 2nd Field Artillery
 3rd Field Artillery
 4th Field Artillery
 5th Field Artillery
 6th Field Artillery
 7th Field Artillery
 8th Field Artillery
 9th Field Artillery
 10th Field Artillery
 11th Field Artillery
 12th Field Artillery
 13th Field Artillery
 14th Field Artillery
 15th Field Artillery
 16th Field Artillery
 17th Field Artillery
 18th Field Artillery
 19th Field Artillery
 20th Field Artillery
 21st Field Artillery
 22nd Field Artillery
 25th Field Artillery
 27th Field Artillery
 29th Field Artillery
 30th Field Artillery
 31st Field Artillery
 32nd Field Artillery
 33rd Field Artillery
 34th Field Artillery
 35th Field Artillery
 36th Field Artillery
 37th Field Artillery
 38th Field Artillery
 39th Field Artillery
 40th Field Artillery
 41st Field Artillery
 42nd Field Artillery
 73rd Field Artillery
 75th Field Artillery
 76th Field Artillery
 77th Field Artillery
 78th Field Artillery
 79th Field Artillery
 80th Field Artillery
 81st Field Artillery
 82nd Field Artillery
 83rd Field Artillery
 84th Field Artillery
 92nd Field Artillery
 94th Field Artillery
 319th Field Artillery
 103rd Field Artillery
 201st Field Artillery
 320th Field Artillery
 321st Field Artillery
 333rd Field Artillery
 377th Field Artillery

Infantry

Regular Army regiments

 1st Infantry
 2nd Infantry
 3rd Infantry
 4th Infantry
 5th Infantry
 6th Infantry
 7th Infantry
 8th Infantry
 9th Infantry
 10th Infantry
 11th Infantry
 12th Infantry
 13th Infantry
 14th Infantry
 15th Infantry
 16th Infantry
 17th Infantry
 18th Infantry
 19th Infantry
 20th Infantry
 21st Infantry
 22nd Infantry
 23rd Infantry
 26th Infantry
 27th Infantry
 28th Infantry
 29th Infantry
 30th Infantry
 31st Infantry
 32nd Infantry
 33rd Infantry
 34th Infantry
 35th Infantry
 36th Infantry
 38th Infantry
 39th Infantry
 41st Infantry
 46th Infantry
 47th Infantry
 48th Infantry
 50th Infantry
 51st Infantry
 52nd Infantry
 54th Infantry
 58th Infantry
 60th Infantry
 61st Infantry
 75th Infantry
 87th Infantry
 187th Infantry
 188th Infantry
 325th Infantry
 327th Infantry
 501st Infantry
 502nd Infantry
 503rd Infantry
 504th Infantry
 505th Infantry
 506th Infantry
 508th Infantry
 509th Infantry
 511th Infantry

Army Reserve regiments

 59th Infantry
 305th Infantry
 306th Infantry
 307th Infantry
 314th Infantry
 315th Infantry
 322nd Infantry
 345th Infantry
 357th Infantry
 358th Infantry
 359th Infantry
 381st Infantry
 383rd Infantry
 409th Infantry
 410th Infantry
 411th Infantry
 442nd Infantry

Special Forces Regiment

 1st Special Forces

Illustrations of organization under CARS

Chart 1 – Typical Infantry Regiment under CARS

Chart 2 – Typical Armor/Cavalry Regiment under CARS

Chart 3 – Typical Field Artillery Regiment under CARS

Chart 4 – Typical Air Defense Artillery Regiment under CARS

Citations

General references 
 John K. Mahon and Romana Danysh, CMH 60-3: Infantry, Part I: Regular Army, The Pentomic Concept and the Combat Arms Regimental System
 Department of the Army Regulations

Further reading 
 Department of the Army Publications
 672-5-1. Military Awards. 1974-06-03
 840-10. Flags and Guidons: Description and use of flags, guidons, tabards and automobile plates. 1962-08-23.
 870-5 Historical Activities: Military history – responsibilities, policies and procedures. 1977-01-22.
 870-20 Historical Activities: Historical properties and museums, 1976-09-28
 _. Circular 220-1. October 1960.
 _. Pamphlet 220-1. June 1957.
 "America's Pride: Famous Old Regiments to Get New Life," The Army Reservist, III (October 1957), 10–11.
 "Army Studies Ways to Keep Famed Regiments on Roster," Army Times (28 April 1956), 7.
 Atwood, Thomas W. "A Hard Look at CARS," Armor, LXXII (July–August 1963), 19–22.
 Booth, Thomas W. "Combat Arms Regimental System," Army Information Digest, XII (August 1957) 24–31.
 Bourjaily, Monte Jr. "Battle Honor 'Lies' ", Army Times (10 March 1962), 13.
 Bourjaily, Monte Jr. "Colorful Names Would Identify Regiments," Army Times (2 August 1958), 9.
 Bourjaily, Monte Jr. "The Combat Regiments," Army Times (16 July 1960), 15.
 Bourjaily, Monte Jr. "Is Regimental Plan a Paper Exercise?" Army Times (23 March 1957).
 Bourjaily, Monte Jr. "The Question of CARS," Army, XI (July 1961), 23–27.
 Bourjaily, Monte Jr. "Regimental Plan Can Live or Die," Army Times (16 February 1957).
 Bourjaily, Monte Jr. "Unit Homes in '57?" Army Times (29 December 1956), 1, 35.
 "CARS Confusion," editorial, Army Times (25 July 1959), 10+.
 Corbett, W.H. "New Life for Old Regiments," National Guardsman, XII (April 1958), 8, 9; (May 1958), 4, 5.
 Danysh, Romana. "What’s the History of Your Unit?" Army Digest, XXII (December 1967), 12–15.
 Dupuy, R. Ernest. "Our Regiments will Live Forever," Army-Navy-Air Force Register, LXXVIII (September 1957), 3.
 Eliot, George Fielding. "Army’s Future Tightly Linked to 'Future of the Regiment,’ " Army Times (June 1955).
 "Future of the Regiment," Army Times (4 December 1954); (11 December 1954).
 Gavin, James M. "The Traditional Regiments will Live On," Army Combat Forces Journal, V (May 1955), 20–21.
 Harrison, O.C. "Doubts About the Regimental System," Army, VII (July 1957), 62+.
 Harrison, O.C.  "The Combat Arms Regimental System," Armor, LXVI (November–December 1957), 18–21.
 "Historic Regimental Designations to be Retained by the Army," Army Navy Air Force Register, LXXVII, 1.
 Jones, F. P. "The Cost of Going Regimental," Army, XVII (May 1967), 47–49.
 Keliher, John G. "CARS is OK. It Can Do the Job," Army, XI (May 1961), 70–71.
 Kennedy, William V. "Continuity Through the Regiment," National Guardsman, XIII (February 1959), 2, 3, 31.
 Lamison, K.R. and John Wike. "Combat Arms Regimental System," Army Information Digest, XIX (September 1964), 16–24.
 Mahon, John K. and Romana Danysh. Infantry. ARMY LINEAGE SERIES. Washington: Government Printing Office, 1972. Pages 87–100.
 McMahon, Walter L. "CARS '75; Permanent Headquarters for the Combat Arms Regimental System." US Army War College Research Paper, 31 October 1974.
 Palmer, Bruce Jr. "Let’s Keep the Regiment," Army Combat Forces Journal, V (May 1955), 22–23.
 "Reserves Brought into CARS," Army Times (4 April 1959).
 Schmieier, Elmer. "Long Live the Regiment," Army, VII (April 1957), 25–28.
 Short, James Harvey. "Young Soldiers Fade Away." Student essay, US Army War College, 13 January 1967.
 Sinnreich, Richard H. and George K. Osborn. "Revive the Regiment, Rotate, and Reorganize," Army, XXV (May 1975), 12–14.
 Stubbs, Mary Lee and Stanley Russell Connor. Armor-Cavalry. ARMY LINEAGE SERIES. Washington: Government Printing Office, 1969. Pages 81–83.
 Tallat-Kelpsa, Algis J. "A Regiment as Home for Career Soldiers," Army, XXI (January 1971), 51–52.
 Wike, John W. "Our Regimental Heritage," Army Information Digest, XIX (February 1964), 50–56.
 Organizational History Branch, United States Army Center of Military History

U.S. Army Combat Arms Regimental System